CIDOB may refer to:

 CIDOB Foundation, the Barcelona Centre for International Affairs (originally and in ), a think-tank on international affairs based in Barcelona, Spain
 Confederation of Indigenous Peoples of Bolivia, (formerly ), a Bolivian organization of indigenous people.

es:CIDOB